My Late Wives is a mystery novel by the American writer John Dickson Carr, who published it under the name of Carter Dickson.  It is a whodunnit featuring the series detective Sir Henry Merrivale and his long-time associate, Scotland Yard's Chief Inspector Humphrey Masters.

Plot summary

Roger Bewlay is a murderer; the British police are sure he's a murderer, and so is noted detective and explainer of the impossible, Sir Henry Merrivale.  Bewlay has married at least four women who promptly vanish on their honeymoons.

Unfortunately, Bewlay himself has also vanished.

Years later, a well-known actor receives the script of a play about Roger Bewlay from an anonymous source, which he determines to produce and in which he will star.  The script contains information known only to the police, one witness and Roger Bewlay himself.  That reopens the old case and involves the actor, his good-looking female director, and a woman named Mildred Lyons who soon turns up dead in the actor's bedroom.

Sir Henry Merrivale must identify Roger Bewlay's new identity and work out an extremely ingenious place to hide a corpse.

1946 American novels
Novels by John Dickson Carr
William Morrow and Company books